Muhammad Javed (born 25 December 1964) is a Pakistani cricketer. He played in fifteen first-class and ten List A matches between 1982 and 1991. In February 2020, he was named in Pakistan's squad for the Over-50s Cricket World Cup in South Africa. However, the tournament was cancelled during the third round of matches due to the COVID-19 pandemic.

References

External links
 

1964 births
Living people
Pakistani cricketers
Multan cricketers
Muslim Commercial Bank cricketers
Place of birth missing (living people)